.tg is the Internet country code top-level domain (ccTLD) for Togo. Although there are no restrictions on who can register domains in this TLD, it is not often used outside Togo.  

, no online registration and domain maintenance features were available on the registry site, although a basic web-based whois capability is provided.

External links

 IANA .tg whois information
 CAFE-CAFE Internet (en français)

Country code top-level domains
Communications in Togo
Computer-related introductions in 1996
Science and technology in Togo

sv:Toppdomän#T